The Jefferson County Library Cooperative (JCLC) is a 501(c)(3) tax-exempt educational consortium of public libraries in Jefferson County, Alabama. The JCLC administrative office is located at the Birmingham Public Central Library. The member libraries within the cooperative are autonomous, with each one maintaining its own board, director and budget.

History
Jefferson County has had a countywide public library service since 1924, however, no-fee service for Jefferson County citizens began in 1978. In 1985, it was reorganized as Birmingham Area Library Services under the framework issued by the Alabama Public Library Service. In 1997, it was renamed the Jefferson County Library Cooperative and continues to operate as a not-for-profit educational organization.

Member libraries
 Adamsville Library
 Avondale Regional Branch Library
 Bessemer Library
 Birmingham Botanical Gardens Library
 Central Library
 East Ensley Branch Library
 East Lake Branch Library
 Eastwood Branch Library
 Emmet O'Neal Library
 Ensley Branch Library
 Five Points West Regional Library
 Fultondale Library
 Gardendale-Martha Moore Library
 Graysville Public Library
 Homewood Library
 Hoover Public Library
 Hueytown Public Library
 Inglenook Branch Library
 Irondale Public Library
 Leeds-Jane Culbreth Public Library
 Midfield Public Library
 North Avondale Branch Library
 North Birmingham Regional Branch Library
 Pleasant Grove Public Library
 Powderly Branch Library
 Pratt City Branch Library
 Slossfield Branch Library
 Smithfield Branch Library
 Southside Branch Library
 Springville Road Regional Branch Library
 Tarrant Public Library
 Titusville Branch Library
 Trussville Public Library
 Vestavia Hills Public Library
 Walter J. Hanna Library
 Warrior-Evelyn Thornton Public Library
 West End Branch Library
 Woodlawn Branch Library
 Wylam Branch Library

References

External links
Jefferson County Library Cooperative
Jefferson County Library Cooperative Catalog
Map of the Jefferson County Library Cooperative's Libraries

Education in Jefferson County, Alabama
Library consortia in Alabama